The 2014–15 Premier League International Cup was the inaugural season of the Premier League International Cup, a European club football competition organised by the Premier League for under-21 players.

Qualification
For English sides qualification was via performance in the 2013–14 Barclays Under 21 Premier League with the top eight sides qualifying for the competition. Liverpool U21s and Manchester United U21s did not take up the opportunity to enter the competition and they were replaced with West Ham U21s and Norwich City U21s who finished 9th and 10th respectively. Entry of European teams was by invitation and was influenced by the quality of each club's academy.

Group stage
Group-stage matches were played between 15 October 2014 and 31 January 2015. The teams were drawn into four groups of four with two English sides and two European sides in each group.

Group A

Group B

Group C

Group D

Knock-out stages

Host team listed first
Bold winner

Quarter-finals

Semi-finals

Final

Statistics

Top scorers

Own goals

Clean sheets

See also
 Premier League International Cup
 2014–15 Professional U21 Development League
 2014–15 UEFA Youth League

References

External links
Premier League International Trophy Fixtures, results and tables

2014-15
International Cup
2014–15 in European football
2014–15 in English football